The HP LaserJet 5 is a group of monochrome laser printers produced in the mid-1990s as part of the LaserJet series by Hewlett Packard (HP).  It is the successor to the HP LaserJet 4 series of printers. After the LaserJet 5 series, however, HP introduced a new naming convention for its LaserJet line. While the LaserJet 5L and 5P were replaced with the LaserJet 6L and 6P, there was never a LaserJet 6; the successor to the LaserJet 5/5M/5N/5se line was the LaserJet 4000 series, and the successor to the LaserJet 5si/5siMX/5siNX was the LaserJet 8000 series.  In addition, the LaserJet 4V/4MV was not succeeded by a LaserJet 5 series printer, as its successor was the LaserJet 5000 series.

LaserJet 5 range

References

5